Dewitt Clinton Giddings (July 18, 1827 – August 19, 1903) served three non-consecutive terms in the United States House of Representatives as a representative from Texas.

Early life

Dewitt Clinton Giddings was born July 18, 1827, in Susquehanna County, Pennsylvania.  He was the youngest of eight children of James and Lucy (Demming) Giddings.  In addition to his brother, Jabez Demming Giddings, other of Giddings's brothers relocated from Pennsylvania to Texas.  George Giddings and John James Giddings were successful operators of the San Antonio, Texas to Santa Fe, New Mexico Mail Line.

Giddings worked teaching school part-time to finance his education as a civil engineer and later was employed as a railroad engineer.

He began his legal studies in Honesdale, Pennsylvania in 1850.

When word reached home that Giddings's older brother, Giles, died of wounds received at the battle of San Jacinto, another brother, Jabez Demming Giddings, traveled to Texas to Claim Giles's land bounty.  Giddings joined his brother in Brenham, Texas in 1852 and in 1853 was admitted to the Texas bar.  He was his brother's junior partner in a law practice in Brenham.

Military service

During the American Civil War Giddings served as Lieutenant Colonel of the 21st Texas Cavalry Regiment in the Confederate States Army.

Public service
Giddings first served in the Forty-second Congress  after a controversial election in which he defeated William T. Clark by 135 votes.  Suspected voting irregularities gave the House seat to Clark initially, but Giddings successfully contested the election and took his seat in Congress.  Giddings was reelected to the Forty-third Congress (May 13, 1872 – March 4, 1875) and to the Forty-fifth Congress (March 4, 1877 – March 4, 1879).

Personal life

In 1860, he married Malinda C Lusk, daughter of Texas soldier and politician Samuel C. Lusk.  The couple had five children, three of which survived to adulthood, De Witt, May Belle and Lilian.

Death

On August 19, 1903, De Witt Clinton Giddings succumbed to heart disease and died in Brenham, Texas.  He is buried along with his wife in Prairie Lea Cemetery in Brenham.

References

External links
 

1832 births
1892 deaths
Texas lawyers
Democratic Party members of the United States House of Representatives from Texas
Northern-born Confederates
19th-century American politicians
Confederate States Army officers
People from Susquehanna County, Pennsylvania
People of Texas in the American Civil War
19th-century American lawyers
Military personnel from Pennsylvania